Mamadou Sidibé (born 28 December 1992) is a Malian professional footballer who plays for Bahir Dar Kenema.

Club career
Sidibé played for AS Police de Bamako from 2011 to 2014, when he transferred to Olympique Khouribga.

International career
In January 2014, coach Djibril Dramé, invited him to be a part of the Mali squad for the 2014 African Nations Championship. He helped the team to the quarter finals where they lost to Zimbabwe by two goals to one.

References

External links
 

1992 births
Living people
Malian footballers
Association football midfielders
Mali international footballers
Botola players
2014 African Nations Championship players
Olympique Club de Khouribga players
Moghreb Tétouan players
Chabab Atlas Khénifra players
Jimma Aba Jifar F.C. players
Bahir Dar Kenema F.C. players
Malian expatriate footballers
Malian expatriate sportspeople in Morocco
Expatriate footballers in Morocco
Malian expatriate sportspeople in Ethiopia
Expatriate footballers in Ethiopia
21st-century Malian people
Mali A' international footballers